Huang Cong (born 10 December 2000) is a Chinese footballer currently playing as a midfielder for Nantong Zhiyun.

Club career
Huang Cong would initially play for the Jiangsu FA youth setup before moving abroad to join Portuguese football club Cova da Piedade where he played for their reserve team Cova da Piedade B. On 23 July 2020 he would return back to China to join second tier club Nantong Zhiyun, however he would be loaned out to third tier club Nanjing City, where he was part of the squad gained promotion at the end of the 2020 China League Two campaign. He would go on to make his debut in a league game on 25 April 2021 against Nanjing City in a 1-1 draw. He would go on to establish himself within the team and helped the club gain promotion to the top tier at the end of the 2022 China League One season.

Career statistics
.

References

External links

2000 births
Living people
People from Guiyang
Footballers from Guizhou
Chinese footballers
Association football midfielders
China League Two players
China League One players
C.D. Cova da Piedade players
Nantong Zhiyun F.C. players
Chinese expatriate footballers
Chinese expatriate sportspeople in Portugal
Expatriate footballers in Portugal